Raymond John Evison OBE, VMH, is a nurseryman, lecturer, author and photographer. Born in 1944 he started his horticultural career at the age of 15 in Shropshire and moved to the island of Guernsey to set up The Guernsey Clematis Nursery in 1984.

Clematis Nursery 

In his lifetime he has introduced over 100 clematis species cultivars,  and The Guernsey Clematis Nursery remains one of the largest specialist producers of young clematis plants and supplies plants worldwide, distributing its plants via both wholesale and retail channels.

Evison’s most recent clematis introductions have focused on compact ornamental clematis cultivars more suitable for small gardens and have been achieved via a joint venture with Danish rose specialist Poulsen Roser A/S.

His first book "Making the Most of Clematis" was issued in 1977 and is now in its 3rd reprint. This was followed by "The Gardener's Guide to Growing Clematis" (1998), "Clematis for Everyone" (2000) and more recently “Clematis for Small Spaces”(2007).

Since the 1980s Evison has had strong representation within numerous horticultural bodies both British and international. After senior level involvement in the International Plants Propagators Society (as a previous international president) and the National Council for Conservation of Plants and Gardens, he was the main driving force behind the formation of the International Clematis Society in 1984, for which he was president from 1989–1991 and is now an honorary fellow.

He has held various positions as chairman of Royal Horticultural Society Committees as well as being a member of the RHS Council for 16 years and he was elected a Vice President of the RHS in 2005.

At a local level within Guernsey he heads up a project targeting the restoration of a Victorian Walled Kitchen Garden as the President of The Guernsey Botanical Trust. He has also taken and supplied photographs of clematis and local wild flowers to the Guernsey Philatelic Bureau for reproduction on Guernsey postage stamps.

Raymond Evison still lives in Guernsey but travels widely both for business, plant hunting and lecture presentations on clematis.

Honours 

In 1995 he was awarded the RHS Victoria Medal of Honour for his outstanding service to British Horticulture.  This was followed by an OBE (2000) for services to Horticulture in Guernsey. He was awarded the RHS Reginald Cory Memorial Cup in 2004 for far-reaching work in breeding and developing new clematis cultivars.  In 2008 his book, “Clematis for Small Spaces”, earned him the Garden Media Guild award for Reference Book Of The Year.

He has displayed clematis at horticultural shows worldwide. His exhibits of clematis have been awarded 29 RHS Chelsea Show Gold medals to date (as at 2017).

Works
“Making the Most of Clematis” (1977) .
“The Gardeners Guide to Growing Clematis” (1998) .
“Clematis for Everyone” (2000) .
“Clematis for Small Spaces” (2007) .

References

External links 
The Guernsey Clematis Nursery
  Raymond Evison Clematis
 Clematis on the Web
 International Clematis Society

British horticulturists
1946 births
Living people
Officers of the Order of the British Empire
Victoria Medal of Honour recipients